Gento was a 5th-century Gothic warrior in Eastern Roman service. He was married to a Roman woman from Epirus, and the commander of a unit of Roman troops. In 479, when Theodoric the Great attempted to settle the Ostrogoths in Epirus with the help of his relative Sidimund, Gento and the Eastern Roman general Sabinianus were tasked with preventing it.

See also
 Fravitta

Sources
 

5th-century Romans of Gothic descent
5th-century Byzantine military personnel
Gothic warriors
Generals of Zeno